Isa Sadriu (born 27 December 1963) is a former Kosovo Albanian footballer.

Playing career

Club
After playing with FK Trepča in the Yugoslav Second League since 1981, his talent was spotted by FK Partizan who brought him to their team during the winter break of the 1985–86 Yugoslav First League season. He played a total of 72 matches for Partizan, 22 of which were league ones.  He left in the following winter having won two national championships during his year in Belgrade, and has joined FC Prishtina who was at that time the only top flight club from SAP Kosovo. He made one appearance for Pristina at 1991–92 Yugoslav Second League.  He will later play in German Regionalliga clubs during the late 1990s.

International
On 1 February 1993, Sadriu received a call-up from Kosovo for a friendly match against Albania, and made his debut after being named in the starting line-up.

Managerial career
In 2013, Sadriu, along with Gazmend Haliti, became the coach of the Kosovo U-15 team.

Honours
Partizan
Yugoslav First League: 1985–86, 1986–87

References

External links
 German career stats - FuPa
 Isa Sadriu at Playerhistory

1963 births
Living people
Yugoslav footballers
Kosovan footballers
Kosovo pre-2014 international footballers
Association football midfielders
FK Trepča players
FK Partizan players
FC Prishtina players
Yugoslav First League players
Hertha Zehlendorf players
Kosovan expatriate footballers
Expatriate footballers in Germany
Kosovan expatriate sportspeople in Germany
Kosovan football managers